The white-necked coucal or pied coucal (Centropus ateralbus) is a species of cuckoo in the family Cuculidae. It is endemic to the Bismarck Archipelago. Its natural habitat is subtropical or tropical moist lowland forest.

References

white-necked coucal
Birds of the Bismarck Archipelago
white-necked coucal
Taxonomy articles created by Polbot